Longinos Navás (7 March 1858  Cabacés, Tarragona – 31 December 1938 Girona) was a  Spanish entomologist who specialised in  Plecoptera and  Neuropteroidea.

Father Longinos Navás was  a Jesuit priest. He published extensively on the Neuroptera fauna of Spain in Memorias de la Real. Academia Ciencias y Artes de Barcelona.His papers on worldwide fauna are published in this, other Spanish, German, Italian and American entomological journals.Navás described very many new species. His Neuroptera are in the Museu de Ciències Naturals, Museum of Natural Sciences, Barcelona. His Lepidoptera collections are in Museo Paleontologico de la Universidad de Zaragoza, Zaragoza.

References
Musgrave, A. 1932 Bibliography of Australian Entomology 1775-1930. Sydney.

External links
Archive.org Scan of Neurópteros de España y Portugal (1908)
Archive.org Scan of Navás, L. 1912. Insectos neurópteros nuevos o poco conocidos. Memorias de la Real Academia de Ciencias y Artes de Barcelona (3)10:135-202.
Archive.org Scan of Navás, L. 1912. Notas sobre Mirmeleónidos (Ins. Neur.). Brotéria (Zoológica) 10:29-75, 85-97.
Archive.org  Scan of  Sinopsis de los ascaláfidos : (Ins. Neur.) (1913)
Archive.org  Scan of  Crisopids d'Europa (ins. neur.) .. (1915)
Ephemeroptera Papers including Ephemeroptera
Neuroptera of Florida Papers on American Neuroptera
DEI ZALF Further references

Spanish entomologists
1858 births
1938 deaths